Born to Be Wild is a 1995 American family comedy film released by Warner Bros. under their Warner Bros. Family Entertainment label.

Plot
14-year-old Rick Heller is a juvenile delinquent who continues to get himself into trouble. To keep him out of mischief, his mother, Margaret, puts him to work cleaning the cage of a female western lowland gorilla named Katie. Margaret is teaching Katie to communicate through the use of sign language. When the owner of the gorilla, Gus Charnley, takes her away to become a flea market freak, Rick realizes he loves Katie and goes to rescue her to take her on an adventurous journey that gets her out of the country.  In the end Rick found a home for Katie in the mountains and they say goodbye to each other and Katie makes a family of her own.

Cast
Wil Horneff as Rick Heller
Helen Shaver as Margaret Heller
John C. McGinley as Max Carr
Peter Boyle as Gus Charnley
Jean Marie Barnwell as Lacey Carr
Marvin J. McIntyre as Bob
Gregory Itzin as Walter Mallinson
Titus Welliver as Sergeant Markle
Thomas F. Wilson as Det. Lou Greenberg (as Tom Wilson)
Alan Ruck as Dan Woodley
John Procaccino as Ed Price
Obba Babatundé as Interpreter
David Wingert as Gary James
John Pleshette as Donald Carr
Janet Carroll as Judge Billings
Talia Paul as Gorilla Team

Reception
Peter Stack of the San Francisco Chronicle said the animatronic gorilla looked phony, but concluded "The film has its moments of nutty fun" and "it also has a couple of touching scenes—if you can get beyond that bogus ape look." The Washington Post critic Rita Kempley called it "a heart-yanking family yarn that resembles a simian adaptation of Nell" and also compared the movie to Free Willy.

Review aggregation website Rotten Tomatoes gives the film an approval rating of 0% based on 9 reviews, and an average rating of 3.4/10.

References

External links

1990s adventure comedy films
1995 comedy films
1995 films
American adventure comedy films
American children's comedy films
Fictional gorillas
Films about gorillas
Films based on songs
Films directed by John Gray (director)
Films scored by Mark Snow
Films shot in California
Films shot in Hawaii
Films shot in Washington (state)
Warner Bros. films
1990s English-language films
1990s American films